Jason Ralph (born April 7, 1986) is an American actor and theater producer. Ralph began his career in theater, most notably performing in Peter and the Starcatcher on Broadway and off-Broadway and producing The Woodsman. From 2015 to 2019, he starred as Quentin Coldwater in the Syfy television series The Magicians. He has also had recurring roles on shows including Aquarius and Younger.

Early life 
Jason Ralph was born in West Palm Beach, Florida. He was raised in McKinney, Texas, a city outside of Dallas, and attended McKinney High School, graduating in 2004. He studied acting at Collin College and then attended State University of New York at Purchase, where he graduated with a BFA degree in 2010.

Career
In 2010, he co-founded the theater company named Strangemen Theater Company, now Strangemen & Co., with his peers from Purchase College. As an artistic director of his company, Strangemen produced several plays including the Obie Award-winning production of The Woodsman by James Ortiz and Edward W. Hardy. In the 2010s, Strangemen produced off-Broadway productions and workshops of The Little Mermaid, Free Delivery, On the Head of a Pin, The Woodsman, and Bernie and Mikey's Trip To the Moon, as well as an annual theater festival. In 2015 and 2018, they produced various workshops at the Guild Hall of East Hampton. As of 2018, Ralph serves as the company's Artistic Director and President.

In 2014, he starred in the comedy-drama movie I'm Obsessed with You alongside Manish Dayal, Rachel Brosnahan and Thomas McDonell. Also that year, he played the role of Ian Thompson in the film A Most Violent Year and starred in the pilot episode of Looking.

In 2015, he played the role of Harrison Dalton, the son of President Dalton in the CBS TV series Madam Secretary and as Mike Vickery in the NBC TV series Aquarius. He also played Stan in Manhattan. The same year, Ralph was cast as Quentin Coldwater, the lead role in the Syfy fantasy drama series The Magicians, which premiered on December 16, 2015. He starred in the show from 2015 to 2019.

Personal life 
It was reported in 2018 that Ralph had married actress Rachel Brosnahan, but Brosnahan later revealed in early 2019 that they had been married "for years" before their relationship became public. Both attended the Golden Globe Awards ceremony in 2019, where she thanked him during her acceptance speech.

Acting credits

Film

Television

Stage

Video games

References

External links
 
 

21st-century American male actors
American male television actors
American male film actors
Living people
Male actors from Texas
State University of New York at Purchase alumni
1986 births